Chesnaye station is a flag stop station in Chesnaye, Manitoba, Canada.  The stop is served by Via Rail's Winnipeg–Churchill train.

Footnotes

External links 
Via Rail Station Information
Government of Manitoba Regional Map

Via Rail stations in Manitoba